TriNet Zenefits (legal name: YourPeople, Inc., previously known as Zenefits) is a technology company based in San Francisco, that offers cloud-based software as a service to companies for managing their human resources, with a particular focus on helping them with payroll and health insurance coverage. The company was founded in 2013.

History
Zenefits was started by Parker Conrad and Laks Srini to help startups and small businesses find insurance quotes and manage employee benefits in one place. It officially launched on February 18, 2013.

In January 2014, the company announced the addition of commuter spending, flexible spending, and 401(k) support, to replace functions usually handled by companies' human resources departments. In July, the company announced support for stock options in its cloud HR platform.

On April 21, 2015, TechCrunch reported that Zenefits raised somewhere between $300 million and $500 million at a valuation worth $3 billion, and possibly as high as $4 billion.  On May 6, the round was reported to have closed with $500 million raised from investors including Fidelity Management, TPG, and Comcast Ventures at a valuation of $4.5 billion. In November, Forbes ran an article on the company defending it against the claim it was in a unicorn bubble.

In 2016 an internal legal investigation at Zenefits found the company's licensing was out of compliance and that Conrad had created a browser extension to skirt training requirements for selling insurance in California. After self-reporting these issues, Zenefits hired an independent third party to do an internal audit of its licensing controls and sent the report to all 50 states. The California Department of Insurance as well as the Massachusetts Division of Insurance began investigations of their own based on Zenefits' report. Parker Conrad resigned as CEO and director in February and COO David O. Sacks was named as his replacement.

Shortly after becoming CEO, Sacks issued a memo to employees in which he banned the consumption of alcohol in the Zenefits offices. "We operate in a highly regulated industry," he wrote, "and it's important to set the right tone in the office. The new policy helps to achieve this and communicate that we are committed to operating with integrity." Days later, The Wall Street Journal dug up an old Zenefits facilities memo from a year previous telling employees that "Cigarettes, plastic cups filled with beer, and several used condoms" had been found in the stairwell of the building. Zenefits was quick to point out that they share this stairwell with dozens of other businesses. When asked about the incident at TechCrunch Disrupt SF, Sacks said, "A lot of the stuff was obviously the media getting carried away. That was not something that happened. That story — there was no truth to it at all."

On February 26, 2016, Zenefits laid off 250 people, about 17 percent of its employees.  In June the company laid off another 9 percent (106 additional people). In July, Zenefits reached its first state regulatory settlement with Tennessee for $62,500, four months after the company's initial self-reporting of compliance issues to the states in which they had been operating. Settlements with additional states followed. On November 28, Zenefits was fined $7 million by California's insurance regulator for allegedly disobeying insurance laws.

On February 3, 2017, Jay Fulcher was appointed as new CEO and Chairman. On February 9, Zenefits announced it would be laying off 45% of its workforce as a way to "move toward an operating model that is sustainable and better reflects the needs of our current business" as noted by Fulcher in a memo sent to employees. In September, the company changed its business model from an insurance broker to a SaaS software platform for brokers, offering HR, payroll, benefits and wellness applications to small businesses and insurance brokers. It also announced it was partnering with Atlanta-based broker OneDigital to begin to offer broker partner-based regional support. OneDigital became the first member of Zenefits' new Broker Partner Program.

In October 2018, the company began offering a well-being product in conjunction with American businesswoman Arianna Huffington's wellness company Thrive Global.

In April 2020, Zenefits laid off 15% of its staff due to the COVID-19 pandemic.  In August, the company added collaboration tools People Hub and Employee Engagement Surveys to assist managers with managing remote workforces during the Coronavirus.

In January 2021, the company launched a healthcare plan shopping feature on its platform. In March 2021, the company entered a financing agreement with private equity firm Francisco Partners that gave the firm control of the company. Forbes reported that the company's value had declined significantly by that time.

Forbes reported that the company's value had declined substantially since its 2013 valuation. 

In February 2022, Zenefits was acquired by Francisco Partners-owned TriNet and was renamed to Trinet Zenefits.

Services
Zenefits offers a platform for small and mid-sized businesses to administer and manage benefits; HR functions such as time tracking, onboarding and employee record keeping; payroll; performance and well-being. The company also offers users access to human resource and payroll advisors.

The platform includes collaboration tools to assist managers with managing newly remote or hybrid workforces. Its People Hub integrates various messaging, collaboration, and interaction features inside Zenefits. Its Employee Engagement Surveys help track company morale and show how motivated employees are in their jobs. The platform also includes an online healthcare plan shopping feature, as well as a cash price insurance model offered by partner Sidecar Health.

Financials
Zenefits has been valued as high as $4.5 billion; it has received $583 million in venture-capital funding from investors such as Andreessen Horowitz, Brendan F. Wallace, Venrock, TPG, I.V.P., and Fidelity.

Locations
Zenefits is headquartered in San Francisco.

References

External links
 

2013 establishments in California
2022 mergers and acquisitions
American companies established in 2013
American corporate subsidiaries
Business services companies of the United States
Companies based in San Francisco
Human resource management
Payroll
Software companies based in California
Software companies established in 2013
Defunct software companies of the United States
Y Combinator companies